Teenage Wrist is an American alternative rock band from Los Angeles. In 2015, the band released their debut EP Dazed. In late 2017, they signed to Epitaph Records, which released the band's first full-length album, Chrome Neon Jesus, in 2018. The band's second album, Earth Is a Black Hole, was released in 2021. Their sound has been described as shoegaze and grunge.

The band performed at Emo Nite Day in December 2017 and toured through the West Coast in early 2018. In August 2018, they performed at the Reading and Leeds Festivals in England.

Members
Current

 Anthony Salazar – drums (2014–present)
 Marshall Gallagher – guitar, vocals (2014–present)

Past

 Kamtin Mohager – bass guitar, vocals (2014–2019)
 Chase Barham – guitar (2018–2020)

Live
 Jordan Kulp - guitar (2022-present)
 Jose Trujillo - bass (2022-present)
 McCoy Kirgo - guitar (2021-2022)
 Matt Cohen - bass (2021-2022)
 Jacob Evergreen - guitar (2021)

Timeline

Discography

Studio albums 
 Chrome Neon Jesus (2018)
 Earth Is a Black Hole (2021)

EPs 
Dazed (2015)
Live at Noise Coalition (2016)
Part Time Punks (2018)
Counting Flies (2019)

Singles 
 "Afterglow" (2015)
 "Slide Away" (2015)
 "Stoned, Alone" (2018)
 "Swallow" (2018)
 "Silverspoon" (2020)
 "Earth Is a Black Hole" (2020)
 "Taste of Gasoline" (2020)
 "Yellowbelly" (2021)
 "Is It Really You?" (with Loathe) (2022)

References 

Musical groups established in 2014
Alternative rock groups from California
Musical groups from Los Angeles
Epitaph Records artists
2014 establishments in California